Mount Peddie is an isolated mountain 5 nautical miles (9 km) north of Webster Bluff and north of the Phillips Mountains, at the north edge of the Ford Ranges in Marie Byrd Land. Mapped from surveys by United States Geological Survey (USGS) and U.S. Navy air photos (1959–65). Named by Advisory Committee on Antarctic Names (US-ACAN) for Norman W. Peddie, geomagnetician and seismologist at Byrd Station, 1964.

References

Mountains of Marie Byrd Land